This page lists notable alumni and students of the University of California, Berkeley. Alumni who also served as faculty are listed in bold font, with degree and year.

Notable faculty members are in the article List of University of California, Berkeley faculty.

Nobel laureates

Turing Award laureates
The Turing Award is considered to be the "Nobel Prize" of computer science.

Academy Award

Recipients

Nominees

Pulitzer Prize

Emmy Award

Fields Medal

Wolf Prize

National Humanities Medal

National Medal of Science

National Medal of Technology

Breakthrough Prize

Gödel Prize

MacArthur Fellowship
The MacArthur Fellowship is also known as the "Genius Grant" or "Genius Award"

Academia

Arts and media

Athletics

Business and entrepreneurship

Sally Schmitt, BS 1952 Founder The French Laundry

Law

Politics and government

Religion, spirituality, and lifestyle

Science and technology

Fictional

See also
List of University of California, Berkeley faculty
List of companies founded by UC Berkeley alumni
List of University of California, Berkeley alumni in business and entrepreneurship

References

Berkeley alumni
Alumni